Trifluorosulfate is an ion with the formula SO2F3−. This term is ambiguous with three fluorosulfate ions (SO3F)3. It can also be confused with the trifluoromethyl sulfate ion.

Properties
The trifluorosulfate ion has a distorted trigonal bipyramid shape with C2v symmetry. On the equator are two oxygen atoms with a bond to sulfur of length 143.2 pm. Also one fluorine atom on the equator has length 157.9 pm. The two other fluorine atoms at the apexes of the pyramids have bond lengths 168.5 pm and form an angle ∠FSF of 165.2°.

List

References

Fluorine compounds
Sulfur compounds